Emil Stanisław Rappaport (8 July 1877 – 10 August 1965) was the son of Feliks Rappaport and Justyna Bauerertz a Polish Jewish lawyer . He was a specialist in criminal law and a founder of the doctrine of international criminal law. In 1930, he was awarded the Commander's Cross with Star of  Order of Polonia Restituta.

Education 
From 1897-1901 he studied law at the Russian Imperial University of Warsaw. In 1910 received a Doctor of Law degree at the university in Neuchâtel in Switzerland.

Academic career 
From 1919 he was a member of the Codification Committee, one of the founders of International Association of Penal Law (L'Association Internationale de Droit Penal) and he served as its vice-chairman between 1924 and 1939. He proposed that not only aggressive war, but also the propaganda
for aggressive war should be considered an international crime.

He is co-founder and member of the Senate of Free Polish University  and a professor of criminal policy at this university. In the years 1920-1932, as an assistant professor, taught criminal law at the University of Lviv and in 1948 is appointed full professor at the University of Łódź.

Judicial career 
From 1917 to 1919 he was an appellate court judge in Warsaw, and from 1919 to 1951, he was a judge of the Supreme Court of the Republic of Poland.

War years 
In the period of the German occupation, he was arrested by the Gestapo and held prisoner for almost one year in Pawiak and Mokotow Prison (under the charge of miscarriage of justice of citizens of German nationality).

After 1945 
Under the pseudonym of Stanislaw Barycz he wrote as a journalist for various magazines. 
His book " Nation - Criminal. Offenses of the Nazism and the German nation" consisted of extensive characterization of ideology and social policy of Nazism, after which followed the proposals of the German nation's punishment for his crimes. He was aware that his ideas are radical and may raise doubts. He opted for a penalty consistent with the guilt of the accused. He pointed to the criminal nature of the German nation. He noted that, regardless of the personal activities of members of the criminal organization subject to punishment are also punished in democratic societies perpetrators of offenses committed unintentionally, if not opposed to the consequences of their actions. Partakers of the crime are those who silently accept them. He consented to the absolute displacement of Germans from the area of the new Polish territories but he also proposed action to destroy German industry, making the transformation of the occupied country into a peaceful agrarian society. For this purpose the number of Germans should be reduced, by expelling them e.g., to Africa. It is significant that he recognized Austrians as innocent and even believed that future peaceful revival of German culture will come from their country. The views expressed at that time were not isolated, they reflect the thinking of the time, popular with both street people and some intellectuals, infected by memories of the war that just ended.

He was an opponent of the death penalty and is quoted as saying: "Only those judges who execute personally should have the right to impose capital punishment".

In June 1946, was appointed as the member of the Supreme National Tribunal. He retired in 1960.

Publications

References

External links 
 Biography (Polish)
 PWN Polish Encyclopaedia article (Polish)

                   

1877 births
1965 deaths
19th-century Polish Jews
20th-century Polish judges
Lawyers from Warsaw
Officers of the Order of Polonia Restituta